The Police Murderer is a 1994 Swedish police film about Martin Beck, directed by Peter Keglevic.

Plot
A woman is found murdered in a closed amusement park. A young couple who happen to be there at the same time become suspects for the murder. They are haunted by police but only criminal inspector Martin Beck believe they are innocent.

Cast
Gösta Ekman as Martin Beck
Kjell Bergqvist as Lennart Kollberg
Rolf Lassgård as Gunvald Larsson
Tomas Norström as Herrgott Nöjd
Johan Widerberg as Kasper
Anica Dobra as Kia
 as Gunnar Danielsson
Heinz Hoenig as Mård
Jonas Falk as Stig Åke Malm
Agneta Ekmanner as Greta Hjelm
Stig Engström as Kaj Sundström
Anne-Li Norberg as Sigbrit Mård
Johan H:son Kjellgren as Mohlin
 as Cecilia Sundström
Petra Nielsen as Eva
 as Mats
 as Rick
Mikael Persbrandt as Police Officer

External links

German mystery drama films
Swedish mystery drama films
Martin Beck films
Films based on Swedish novels
1990s Swedish films
1990s German films